Ikigait is a former community in Greenland about 3 kilometers west of Narsarmijit. It was the site of Herjólfr Bárðarson's farm Herjolfsnes ("Herjolf's Point"), one of the easternmost of the Norse settlements during their colonization of Greenland. 

The location was established around 1885, when a few artifacts were discovered and returned to Denmark. In 1921, an excavation was led by Danish historian and archaeologist Poul Nørlund (1888-1951), which found the church graveyard.

References

Norse settlements in Greenland